Obereopsis is a genus of longhorn beetles of the subfamily Lamiinae, containing the following species:

 Obereopsis angolana Breuning, 1957
 Obereopsis angolensis Breuning, 1958
 Obereopsis angustifrons Breuning, 1957
 Obereopsis annamensis Breuning, 1957
 Obereopsis annulicornis Breuning, 1957
 Obereopsis antenigra Breuning, 1963
 Obereopsis antenigripennis Breuning, 1977
 Obereopsis apicalis Kolbe, 1894
 Obereopsis assimilis Breuning, 1957
 Obereopsis aterrima Breuning, 1949
 Obereopsis atriceps Breuning, 1950
 Obereopsis atricollis Breuning, 1957
 Obereopsis atrifrons Breuning, 1957
 Obereopsis atritarsis Pic, 1920
 Obereopsis atrodiscalis Breuning, 1967
 Obereopsis atrosternalis Breuning, 1956
 Obereopsis aurata Breuning, 1954
 Obereopsis aureotomentosa Breuning, 1950
 Obereopsis auriceps Lepesme & Breuning, 1953
 Obereopsis aurosericea Aurivillius, 1914
 Obereopsis basalis Breuning, 1963
 Obereopsis bicolor Breuning, 1977
 Obereopsis bootangensis Breuning, 1970
 Obereopsis coimbatorana Breuning, 1974
 Obereopsis conradti Breuning, 1957
 Obereopsis endroedii Breuning, 1973
 Obereopsis flaveola Breuning, 1957
 Obereopsis flavipes Hintz, 1919
 Obereopsis himalayana Breuning, 1971
 Obereopsis insignis Aurivillius, 1907
 Obereopsis javanicola Breuning, 1964
 Obereopsis lineaticeps (Pic, 1911)
 Obereopsis longicornis Hintz, 1919
 Obereopsis mabokensis Breuning, 1977
 Obereopsis mausoni Breuning, 1961
 Obereopsis medana Breuning, 1951
 Obereopsis mediofuscovitticollis Breuning, 1977
 Obereopsis minutissima Breuning, 1950
 Obereopsis mirei Breuning, 1977
 Obereopsis mjobergi (Aurivillius, 1925)
 Obereopsis modica (Gahan, 1895)
 Obereopsis monticola Hintz, 1919
 Obereopsis nepalensis Breuning, 1975
 Obereopsis nigronotatipes (Pic, 1940)
 Obereopsis nimbae Lepesme & Breuning, 1952
 Obereopsis obscuritarsis Chevrolat, 1855
 Obereopsis obsoleta Chevrolat, 1858
 Obereopsis paraflaveola Breuning, 1977
 Obereopsis paratogoensis Breuning, 1971
 Obereopsis paratricollis Breuning, 1967
 Obereopsis paravariipes Breuning, 1977
 Obereopsis pseudannulicornis Breuning, 1957
 Obereopsis quadrinotaticollis Breuning, 1949
 Obereopsis sericea Gahan, 1895
 Obereopsis sublongicollis Breuning, 1956
 Obereopsis submodica Breuning, 1974
 Obereopsis subterrubra Breuning, 1950
 Obereopsis sumatrensis Breuning, 1951
 Obereopsis togoensis Breuning, 1961
 Obereopsis trinotaticollis Breuning, 1967
 Obereopsis varieantennalis Breuning, 1982
 Obereopsis variipes Chevrolat, 1858
 Obereopsis verticenigra Breuning, 1957
 Obereopsis walshae (Fisher, 1937)
 Obereopsis wittei Breuning, 1953

References

 
Saperdini